Clifford William Wilton (15 March 1916 - 16 July 1987) was a Scottish rugby union player and businessman. He was the 94th President of the Scottish Rugby Union.

Early life and education
Grandson of Sir Thomas Wilton, founder of Renwick Wilton & Co., coal merchants and travel agents, Clifford William Wilton was born at Newcastle-on-Tyne and educated at Fettes College, then Caius College, Cambridge (MA), and Gray's Inn, from where he was called to the Bar and thus qualified as a barrister.

Business career
Wilton had a successful business career, becoming executive chairman of Renwick Wilton & Dobson (Holdings) Ltd and associated companies, and chairman of the Western Fuel Company.

Rugby Union career

Amateur career
Wilton played rugby for Fettes College, After Fettes he played for Fettesian-Lorettonians in 1935.
then for Caius College at the University of Cambridge; where he played for Cambridge University. While at Cambridge he was fined £5 for driving a sports car without insurance in October 1936. He scored a try against the University of Oxford in the 1936 match.

In 1937 he played for London Scottish. While based in Northumberland with the Territorial Army he also played for Northern.

He played for a Territorial Army XV in 1937 and 1938 and a Services XV in 1939.

Provincial career
He made the Scotland Possibles side in 1937.

Administrative career
He was Honorary Secretary of the Four Nations tour committee. He had to make a statement confirming that the tour to South Africa would be going ahead despite condemnation of the apartheid regime in 1961: 'We have great respect for the opinions of these different bodies, but so far as we are concerned our plans, which were made some time ago, are going ahead.'

Wilton was a member of the Scottish Rugby Union since 1964.

He was on the board of the IRB from 1972 to 1980.

Wilton became the 94th President of the Scottish Rugby Union. He served the standard one year from 1980 to 1981.

The Newcastle Journal had to apologise to Wilton on 12 June 1985 when they stated he had died. In fact, it was another past president of the Scottish Rugby Union Charlie Drummond who had died.

Military career
He was a 2nd Lieutenant in the 72nd (Northumberland) Field Brigade of the Territorial Army in 1937. He later served with the Royal Artillery. In 1942-43 he was in an Italian Prisoner of War camp.

Personal life
In 1939, Wilton married Alice Linda Travers, a tap dancer and former actress, sister to Bill Travers and Linden Travers. They had three daughters, the second of whom being the actress Penelope Wilton. He lived at 86, Lexham Gardens, Kensington, London W8, and was a member of the Constitutional Club, the City Livery Club, and the British Sportsman's Club. He died 16 July 1987.

References

1916 births

1987 deaths
Scottish rugby union players
Presidents of the Scottish Rugby Union
Cambridge R.U.F.C. players
Scotland Possibles players
London Scottish F.C. players
Fettesian-Lorretonian rugby union players
Rugby union locks